Mordellistena balcanica is a species of beetle in the genus Mordellistena of the family Mordellidae. It was described in 1967 and can be found in Bulgaria and Republic of Macedonia.

References

balcanica
Beetles described in 1967
Beetles of Europe